Michael Coreno (born August 31, 1984 in Toronto, Ontario)  is a Canadian ice dancer. Coreno began skating at age seven. In 2003, he teamed up with Allie Hann-McCurdy, with whom he was 2010 Four Continents silver medallist and 2008 Canadian bronze medallist. The pair retired in June 2010, to coach at the Gloucester Skating Club.

Competitive highlights

With Hann-McCurdy

With Steeves

Programs 
(with Hann-McCurdy)

References

External links

 
 Official site

Canadian male ice dancers
Living people
1984 births
Figure skaters from Toronto
Four Continents Figure Skating Championships medalists
21st-century Canadian people